The Museum of Stamps and Coins is located in the Fontvieille section of Monaco.  It tells the postal history of the principality, and contains a display of Monegasque money dating to 1640.

An elite philatelic club, the Club de Monte-Carlo, was established in 1999 and is headquartered at the museum. The club showcases rare material at the museum on a bi-annual basis.

See also
 List of museums in Monaco
 Postage stamps and postal history of Monaco

References

External links 
Museums at Visitmonaco.com

1950 establishments in Monaco
Fontvieille, Monaco
Museums in Monaco
Numismatic museums in Europe
Philatelic museums